The 1967 Campeonato Paulista de Futebol da Divisão Especial de Profissionais, organized by the Federação Paulista de Futebol, was the 66th season of São Paulo's top professional football league. Santos won the title for the 10th time. Prudentina was relegated and the top scorer was Corinthians's Flávio with 21 goals.

Championship
The championship was disputed in a double-round robin system, with the team with the most points winning the title and the team with the fewest points being relegated.

Playoffs

Top Scores

References

Campeonato Paulista seasons
Paulista